Maurice McLoughlin defeated R. Norris Williams 6–4, 5–7, 6–3, 6–1 in the final to win the men's singles tennis title at the 1913 U.S. National Championships.  The event was held at the Newport Casino in Newport, R.I. in the United States.

Draw

Finals

References

External links
 1913 U.S. National Championships on ITFtennis.com, the source for this draw

Men's singles
1913